Roderick Riley (born March 11, 1981) is an American former basketball player. He played the center position and had a listed height and weight of 6'11" and 327 lbs. In 2009, he won the Jordanian Premier League with Zain.

Early life and college career
Riley attended Beaumont Central High School in Beaumont, Texas. He played college basketball at Prairie View A&M. Riley missed part of his sophomore season due to a knee injury. He started his sophomore season and averaged 9.4 points per game. Riley lost 30 pounds going into his junior season. He helped Prairie View A&M capture the SWAC regular season title as a junior. Riley eared Second Team All-SWAC honors. Riley was suspended for four games during his senior season due to disciplinary reasons.

Professional career
Riley signed with Mitteldeutscher BC in January 2005 after a bitter transfer dispute with Ukraine club BC Vozko. He averaged a team leading 10.8 rebounds per game for the season and helped Mitteldeutscher finish first in the 1st Regionalliga Nord.

In May 2005, Riley joined the Pennsylvania ValleyDawgs of the USBL. In the summer of 2005, Riley joined Coast Star of the Jersey Shore Basketball League. In one game, he scored 32 points and had 18 rebounds and three blocks.

In January 2006, he signed with Ulsan Mobis of the Korean Basketball League. He left the team in March after suffering a knee injury.

He played several seasons in the D League for the Fayetteville Patriots and from 2006–2007 he played for the Bakersfield Jam. In 2018, Riley joined the Colorado 14ers.

In April 2009, Riley signed with Jordanian club Zain where he went on to win the Jordanian Premier League. He also played for the team during the 2009 FIBA Asia Champions Cup where it finished as the runner-up.

References

External links
Profile at proballers.com
College statistics at Sports Reference
Profile at Eurobasket.com

1981 births
Living people
American men's basketball players
Austin Toros players
Bakersfield Jam players
Centers (basketball)
Fayetteville Patriots players
Prairie View A&M Panthers basketball players
Sportspeople from Beaumont, Texas
United States Basketball League players
Al Riyadi Club Beirut basketball players